Solanum robustum, the shrubby nightshade, is a thorny perennial shrub native to northeastern South America of the genus Solanum and is therefore related to the potato and tomato plants.  A medium shrub, the plant may grow 4 to 8 feet (1.2 – 2.4 m) with velvety leaves and stems due to dense stellate trichomes present on all faces of the plant.  Strong, straight or recurved flattened prickles up to 12 millimeters long may be found along the stems.  The leaves grow 6 to 10 inches long and feature nine angled ridges along their perimeter.  S. robustum blooms between late spring and mid fall with small clusters of white to yellow-white star shaped inflorescence followed by white or yellowish marble sized berries.  S. robustum contains various tropane alkaloids in its leaves, fruit and stems and therefore should not be consumed.

References

robustum